In the Light of Darkness is the third studio album by the Swedish melodic death metal band Unanimated.  It was released on Regain, 14 years after their last release, Ancient God of Evil (which was issued on No Fashion).

Track listing

Personnel

Unanimated
 Micke Jansson - Vocals
 Jojje Bohlin - Lead & Rhythm Guitar
 Richard Daemon - Bass
 Peter Stjärnvind - Drums, Guitar on "Strategia Luciferi"

Additional musicians
Erik Wallin, Sebastian Ramstedt, Set Teitan: Guest Leads

Production
Arranged By Unanimated
Produced By Tore Stjerna & Unanimated
Recorded, Engineered, Mixed & Mastered By Tore Stjerna

References

External links
"In The Light Of Darkness" at discogs

2009 albums
Unanimated albums